Linton railway station may refer to:

 Linton railway station (Cambridgeshire), a closed station on the Stour Valley Railway in England
 Linton railway station, Palmerston North, a closed station on the North Island Main Trunk in New Zealand
 Linton railway station, Victoria, a closed station on the Skipton railway line in Australia
 Lynton and Lynmouth railway station, a closed station on the Lynton and Barnstaple Railway in England